Robert Nadeau  (born March 10, 1937) is an American aikido teacher holding the rank of 8th dan and master teacher(Shihan) in the Aikikai.
Nadeau began training in martial arts at the age of 16 and began studying Aikido with American instructor Robert Tan.

After Training in Japan with the founder of Aikido, Morihei Ueshiba, from 1962-1964 Nadeau returned to Northern California and opened a series of martial art schools sharing space with first Professor Sig Kuferath and then Richard Bunch through whom he has had on-going contact with several notable Ju-Jitsu schools and which eventually led to the formation of the California Aikido Association. He is one of three division heads of the California Aikido Association and is also the founder and head instructor of City Aikido of San Francisco, Aikido of San Jose, and Aikido of Mountain View, CA.

Nadeau is well known as a pioneer in the energy and awareness aspects of aikido, having dedicated his lifes work to understanding and translating these principles handed down by Ueshiba into fields beyond aikido, including psychotherapy, personal development.

Relationship with Morihei Ueshiba
 At the end of his study in Japan Nadeau was issued a rare certificate of recognition as an authorized Aikido teacher signed by Morihei Ueshiba and Kisshomaru Ueshiba.
In addition to his enrollment as an Aikido student at Hombu Dojo from 1962-1964 and maintaining a full training and meditation practice during his time in Japan, Nadeau had a close and substantial off-the-mat relationship with Morihei Ueshiba, which included regular extended trips to the Japanese countryside.  Nadeau also assumed the position of publisher of an English-language newsletter about aikido while studying in Japan.  By asking questions during small and sometimes private meetings, Nadeau learned first-hand some of the ideas and philosophies that Ueshiba wished to pass on to interested students.  Fundamental among these teachings was the concept of "two forces" that combine to produce a new identity and "levels" which progress from limited to enhanced capabilities and awareness.  Nadeau refers to the process of moving from one level to the next as an Alchemical transformation. According to Nadeau, this progression occurs in the "functioning realm", i.e. in a manner that improves functioning in everyday life.

What O'Sensei said to him 
If he managed to understand the secret of Aikido, he could accomplish all the very same incredible techniques that O Sensei performed himself in just three months.

Teaching Lineage

Morihei Ueshiba spoke of Izanagi (male) and Izanami (female), the two great forces that, in Shinto mythology, created the islands of Japan.  Or again, he spoke of Fire - Water - Steam as another example of two forces combining to yield a third transformed entity.  These alchemical concepts have infused Nadeau's teaching since his return from his studies with Ueshiba in Japan in 1964.  As a reminder of these direct transmissions, Ueshiba presented Nadeau with several scrolls amongst which are one was translated as "Do the aikido that cannot be seen with the human eye".

Notable Collaborators
In addition to a body of students who are themselves prominent martial artists and teachers in the realm of self-development, Nadeau has worked with many notable collaborators including:

Aikido Instructors:

Frank Doran

Hiroshi Ikeda

Mitsugi Saotome

Seiichi Sugano

Tom Collings
Page 88:  Tom Collings describes what he calls Nadeau manipulating his perception of space, comparing it to a time training with Michio Hikitsuchi

and non-Aikido instructors:

Richard Bunch

Peter Ralston

Professor Sig Kuferath

Publications
 The  "Moon Sensei" YouTube channel publishes an educational video magazine centered around the ongoing evolution of Robert Nadeau's teachings
 "O Sensei's Process, This DVD provides an outline of O-Sensei's approach to training in a step-by-step process.
 Further reading

Seminars
Nadeau has traveled around the world regularly teaching workshops across the United States, Switzerland, Israel and New Zealand

References

Further reading
 Stone, John and Meyer, Ron (eds.) Aikido in American North Atlantic Books 1995. 
 Perry, Susan  Remembering O-Sensei Living and Training with Morihei Ueshiba, Founder of Aikido
 Leonard, George  Way of Aikido, The: Life Lessons from an American Sensei
 Siegel, Andrea  Women in Aikido
 Meyer, Ron and Reeder, Mark  Center: The Power of Aikido
 Suenaka, Roy and Watson, Christopher  Complete Aikido: Aikido Kyohan: The Definitive Guide to the Way of Harmony
 Leonard, George Burr  The Ultimate Athlete 1990.
 Fields, Rick  The Awakened Warrior New Consciousness Reader 1994.
 Bernstein, Aimee  'Stress Less Achieve More: Simple Ways to Turn Pressure into a Positive Force in Your Life" (AMACOM 2015)

External links
 Pranin, Stanley  Aikido Journal  1999
 California Aikido Association  California Aikido Association
 

1937 births
Living people
American aikidoka
Shihan